Magical Love (Chinese: 愛情大魔咒; pinyin: Ai Qing Da Mo Zhou) is a Taiwanese television series. It stars the members of Taiwanese girl-group S.H.E, Lan Cheng-lung and Janet Li. It is a romance drama with 20 episodes.

Synopsis
Yaoqi, Zhu Liye and Hu ShaSha are Dreaming Cheer squad. They are also the trio-star-chaser. In the cab where Zhu LiYe, Yao qi and Hu ShaSha ride in, they chase all the way to the vans driven by stars. Directed by YaoQi, the tacit three girls show their bands and posters, shout out their worship to their idol. They never care about the dangers of bumping the cars driven by stars....

Cast
Ella Chen as Juliet
Lan Cheng-lung as Li Tao
Hebe Tian as Hu Sha Sha
Li Qian Rong as Ding Wen Lin
Liu Zhi Wei as An Dong Hai
Peng Xiao Tong as Yao Qi

Taiwanese drama television series